Gordon Redding (born 30 May 1937), MA (Cambridge, PhD (Manchester), D.Econ h.c. (Stockholm SSE), is a British professor, academic, author, editor, and consultant. He is today a specialist on China and the regional ethnic Chinese, and also works on the comparison of different systems of capitalism, and on the role of education in societal development.His core interest is in the role of culture in the shaping of societal progress. He has published 15 books and 150 articles related to these subjects. He has held a number of professorships, and is currently working as a Senior Fellow of the HEAD Foundation (Human Capital and Education for Asian Development), based in Singapore. This is a non-profit foundation which he was invited by regional philanthropists to establish in 2010, and initially directed to 2014.  He also spent 24 years at the University of Hong Kong, where he founded and directed the HKU Business School (now the Faculty of Business and Economics). For seven years from 1997 he was Director of the Euro-Asia Centre at INSEAD in France. He was also for ten years a Director of the Wharton International Forum, working globally in executive education. Now living in London he held - from 2013 to 2015 - a Visiting Professorial Fellowship at the Institute of Education, UCL.

Early life
Gordon Redding was born in Bootle, Lancashire, England, the son of Leslie Redding and Georgina Redding (née Mitchell). He also has a sister, Lesley. He was educated at Bootle Grammar School, and attended Cambridge University, where he read Economic Geography at Fitzwilliam College. He also holds a doctorate from Manchester Business School and an honorary doctorate from the Stockholm School of Economics.

Career

Professional career
After university and national service, Gordon Redding started work in the retail industry in the UK, as an executive for the department store group Owen Owen Ltd. After a decade of managerial experience, mostly in general management of stores, he took three years to do doctoral research in organization theory at Manchester Business School, under the supervision of Prof Richard Whitley. He then relocated to Hong Kong, allowing him to research extensively in Asia. He spent 24 years at the University of Hong Kong, where he founded and directed the Business School, now the Faculty of Business and Economics. He also founded and directed the Poon Kam Kai Institute of Management  at HKU in the field of executive education.

He has also served as a consultant on executive development, strategy and organisation for large organizations, including HSBC, Cathay Pacific, Hutchison Whampoa, Mandarin Oriental Hotels Group, Bank Mandiri, BHP Billiton, Daimler Chrysler, Christie's and a number of Asian regional conglomerates such as Hutchison Whampoa.

His consultancy has also included work on university governance for the University of Hong Kong, Australian National University, and Monash University.

While serving as Director of the Euro-Asia Centre of INSEAD in France, he developed its research into China with his book  The Spirit of Chinese Capitalism. For two decades earlier he had been honorary Secretary of the Association of Deans of Southeast Asian Graduate Schools of Management. His work has also included membership on the editorial boards of ten research journals. 
He was also a regular guest lecturer for several universities on programs for both MBA, M.Ed., and to executives. He addresses conferences regularly and collaborates in research with colleagues in Europe, Asia, and North America. His career has included guest faculty membership at the Wharton School, Duke University, Columbia University, University of Southern California, Australian National University, Stockholm School of Economics, University of Hawaii, University of Zurich, Xiamen University and Zhejiang University.

In 1987 he spent a sabbatical year in Boston, based at the Institute for the Study of Economic Culture at Boston University, working with Prof Peter Berger, and writing 'The Spirit of Chinese Capitalism', enjoying also a visiting fellowship at the Harvard Fairbank Centre.

He has addressed conferences at the John F. Kennedy School of Government at Harvard, Manchester Business School, University of Stockholm, Institut d'Études Politiques de Paris (also known as Science-Po), Oxford University, among others. He is an Emeritus Professor at the University of Hong Kong, and was awarded an honorary doctorate from the Stockholm School of Economics for services to the school in the teaching and research of Asian business. He has held a Conjoint Professorship at University of Newcastle, Australia, and a Visiting Professorial Fellowship at the Institute of Education, UCL, London.

In 2006 he received the biennial Award for Distinguished Scholarship of the International Association for Chinese Management Research.

Academic career
Following his doctorate at the Manchester Business School and spending 10 years working in the retail industry, he moved to Hong Kong where he furthered his specialisation in the field of comparative management, and conducted research on societal systems of capitalism, with a focus on the role of culture, religion and social capital on the economy.

His main theory work has been on Chinese management, notably in The Spirit of Chinese Capitalism (1990. de Gruyter), and (with Michael Witt) The Future of Chinese Capitalism (2007, Oxford University Press). His current work is on the comparison of different systems of capitalism, and in the societal processes such as education that affect success and failure in supporting a country's progress. His current work is for a book The Orchestration of Societal Progress (Oxford University Press). He has published a further ten books and approximately 150 academic articles. His most recent books include  "The Hidden Form of Capital" (edited with Peter Berger) Anthem Press, "The Oxford Handbook of Asian Business Systems' (edited with Michael Witt), 2014, The Oxford Handbook of Higher Education Systems and University Management (edited with Anthony Drew and Steven Crump) His most significant theory papers have been 'The thick description and comparison of societal systems of capitalism' (Journal of International Business Studies, 2005), and 'Impact of China's invisible societal forces on its intended evolution' in A Lewin, M.Kenney and J P Murmann (eds) China's Innovation Challenge, Cambridge University Press, 2016. Other representative works are ' Separating culture from institutions: the use of semantic spaces as a conceptual domain and the case of China' (Management and Organization Review, 4,2, 2008), and, with Max Boisot and John Child 'Working the system: toward a theory of cultural and institutional competence' (International Studies in Management and Organization 41,1, 2011).

Personal life
Gordon Redding has two sons from a first marriage: Philip (1965, CEO); and Peter (born 1967, Regional head of Asian marketing in a multinational): and six grandchildren. His wife of 33 years is author and journalist Laura Lam and they have a son Thurstan (born August 1992), a Cambridge graduate now an established international photographer. The family is now based in London. Personal interests include Asian art, the social chemistry of good dinner parties, photography, and Victorian biography.

Selected publications

 Redding, G., A. Drew, and S. Crump (eds) (2019) The Oxford Handbook of Higher Education Systems and University Management, Oxford, Oxford University Press.
 Redding G (2017) 'Critical thinking, university autonomy, and societal progress: thoughts on a research agenda', Working paper No.11, January, Centre for Global Higher Education, Institute of Higher Education, UCL. (in press Higher Education Quarterly).
 Witt, M.A. and G. Redding (eds) (2014) The Oxford Handbook of Asian Business Systems, Oxford, Oxford University Press.
 Redding, G. and Peter Ping Li (2013) "Social Capital in Asia: Its Dual Nature and Function" in The Oxford Handbook of Asian Business Systems, Oxford, Oxford University Press.
 Boisot M., J. Child and G. Redding (2011) 'Working the system: towards a theory of cultural and institutional competence', International Studies in Management and Organization, 41:1, 63–96.
 Redding, G. (2010) 'The business systems of Asia', in H. Hasegawa and C. Noronha (eds) Asian Business and Management, London, Palgrave Macmillan. 7–30.
 Berger Peter L. and G. Redding (eds) (2010) The Hidden Form of Capital: the Spiritual Contribution to Prosperity, London, Anthem Press.
 Redding, G. (2008) 'Separating culture from institutions: the use of semantic spaces as a conceptual domain and the case of China'. Management and Organization Review, 4:2, 257–289.
 Redding, G. and M.A. Witt (2007) The Future of Chinese Capitalism, Oxford, Oxford University Press.
 Redding, G, (2005) 'The thick description and comparison of societal systems of capitalism', Journal of International Business Studies, 36, 123–155.
 Redding, G. (1993) The Spirit of Chinese Capitalism, New York, de Gruyter.

References

1937 births
Academic staff of the University of Hong Kong
Alumni of Fitzwilliam College, Cambridge
Alumni of the University of Manchester
British expatriate academics
Living people
People from Bootle